Đầm Hà is a district of Quảng Ninh province in the northeastern region of Vietnam. As of 2003 the district had a population of 31,414. The district covers an area of 290 km². The district capital lies at Đầm Hà.

Administrative divisions
Đầm Hà, Đại Bình, Đầm Hà, Tân Bình, Dực Yên, Quảng An, Quảng Lâm, Quảng Lợi, Quảng Tân, Tân Lập.

References

Districts of Quảng Ninh province